The Liswarta is a river in south-central Poland, a tributary of the Warta river. The Liswarta has a length of 93 km and basin area of 1,558 km2. One of its tributaries is the Pankówka.

Towns and villages
 Gmina Woźniki
 Mzyki
 Gmina Boronów
 Grojec
 Boronów
 Gmina Herby
 Hadra
 Lisów
 Tanina
 Łebki
 Gmina Krzepice
 Lutrowskie
 Krzepice
 Gmina Lipie
 Danków
 Szyszków
 Gmina Popów
 Zawady

Rivers of Poland
Rivers of Silesian Voivodeship